Thaddeus M. Buczko (February 23, 1926 – March 7, 2021) was an American politician who served as a Salem, Massachusetts city councillor, a member of the Massachusetts House of Representatives and as Massachusetts Auditor. Additionally, from 1981 to 1996, Buczko served as a justice of the Essex County Probate and Family Court; Buczko, retired in 1996.

He died on March 7, 2021, in Salem, Massachusetts, at age 95.

Bibliography
 Commonwealth of Massachusetts, 1961-1962 Public Officers of the Commonwealth of Massachusetts, p. 110, (1961).
 Commonwealth of Massachusetts, 1967-1968 Public Officers of the Commonwealth of Massachusetts, p. 25, (1967).
 Wierzbianski, Boleslaw.: Who's Who in Polish America 1st Edition 1996–1997,  (1996).

References

 

1926 births
2021 deaths
Politicians from Salem, Massachusetts
State auditors of Massachusetts
Democratic Party members of the Massachusetts House of Representatives
Massachusetts city council members
Norwich University alumni
American politicians of Polish descent
Massachusetts state court judges